is a Japanese footballer currently playing as a forward for FC Imabari.

Career statistics

Club
.

Notes

References

1998 births
Living people
Sportspeople from Saitama (city)
Association football people from Saitama Prefecture
Tokai University alumni
Japanese footballers
Association football forwards
J3 League players
FC Imabari players